The anserine bursa (tibial intertendinous bursa) is a sub muscular bursa located deep to the pes anserinus on the anteromedial proximal tibia. Pes anserine bursitis is a common inflammatory condition of the anserine bursa.

References 
 

Synovial bursae
Lower limb anatomy
Soft tissue
Musculoskeletal system